Vinnufjellet is an  tall mountain in Sunndal Municipality in Møre og Romsdal county, Norway. The names of the two peaks are translated as Queen's crown and King's crown. The mountain is located just northeast of the village of Sunndalsøra and the Sunndalsfjorden. On the south side of the mountain, the Vinnufossen waterfall flows into the river Driva, just east of the village of Hoelsand.

References

Mountains of Møre og Romsdal
Sunndal